Dasyfidonia is a genus of moths in the family Geometridae.

Species
 Dasyfidonia avuncularia (Guenée, 1857)
 Dasyfidonia macdunnoughi Guedet, 1935

References
 Dasyfidonia at Markku Savela's Lepidoptera and Some Other Life Forms
 Natural History Museum Lepidoptera genus database

Boarmiini
Geometridae genera